John Fletcher Brocklehurst (15 December 1927 – 2005) in Horwich, Lancashire,  England, was an English professional footballer who played as a wing half in the Football League. He also played for Wigan Athletic in the Lancashire Combination, appearing three times in the 1956–57 season.

References

External links

1927 births
2005 deaths
People from Horwich
English footballers
Stalybridge Celtic F.C. players
Accrington Stanley F.C. (1891) players
Bradford (Park Avenue) A.F.C. players
Wigan Athletic F.C. players
Manchester United F.C. players
English Football League players
Association football midfielders